The Ebnefluh, also known as the Äbeni Flue and the Ebenefluh, (3,962 m) is a mountain of the Bernese Alps, located on the border between the Swiss cantons of Bern and Valais. It lies towards the eastern end of the Lauterbrunnen Wall.

References

External links
 The Ebnefluh on SummitPost

Bernese Alps
Mountains of the Alps
Alpine three-thousanders
Mountains of Valais
Mountains of the canton of Bern
Bern–Valais border
Mountains of Switzerland
Three-thousanders of Switzerland